Frederick Dix (June 1883 – 18 February 1966) was a British speed skater. He competed at the 1924 Winter Olympics and the 1928 Winter Olympics.

References

1883 births
1966 deaths
British male speed skaters
Olympic speed skaters of Great Britain
Speed skaters at the 1924 Winter Olympics
Speed skaters at the 1928 Winter Olympics
People from Cley next the Sea